Nanna eningae is a moth of the  subfamily Arctiinae. It was described by Plötz in 1880. It is found in Cameroon, the Republic of Congo, Equatorial Guinea, Ghana, Kenya, Nigeria, Somalia, Togo and Uganda.

References

 Natural History Museum Lepidoptera generic names catalog

Lithosiini
Moths described in 1880